Malone is an unincorporated community in Clinton County, in the U.S. state of Iowa.

History
Malone was originally called Ramessa, but after a fire, the railroad station was moved and renamed Malone, after Malone, New York. A post office was established as Ramessa in 1857, renamed Malone in 1867; the post office was discontinued in 1922. 

Malone's population was 57 in 1902, and 67 in 1925.

References

Unincorporated communities in Clinton County, Iowa
1857 establishments in Iowa
Populated places established in 1857
Unincorporated communities in Iowa